The women's singles competition at the 2023 FIL European Luge Championships was held on 15 January 2023.

Results
The first run was held at 10:18 and the second run at 11:45.

References

Women's singles